Michel Kaham (born 1 June 1951 in Bafang) is a retired Cameroonian professional footballer. He was Cameroon's right-back at the 1982 FIFA World Cup finals, where he played in all three of the squad's matches.

Kaham is currently an assistant manager of the national team.

Honours

Player
Elite 2 Stade of Melong*
Elite 1Aigle NkongsambaElite One (1): 1971
 Canon YaoundéElite One (1): 1974

ManagerOlympic Mvolyé'''
Cameroonian Cup (1): 1992

External links
 

  
 MISL stats

People from West Region (Cameroon)
Cameroonian footballers
Cameroon international footballers
Cameroonian expatriate footballers
Expatriate footballers in France
1982 FIFA World Cup players
1972 African Cup of Nations players
1952 births
Canon Yaoundé players
Tours FC players
Valenciennes FC players
Ligue 1 players
Quimper Kerfeunteun F.C. players
Ligue 2 players
Cameroonian expatriate sportspeople in France
Cleveland Force (original MISL) players
Kansas City Comets (original MISL) players
Toledo Pride players
Major Indoor Soccer League (1978–1992) players
American Indoor Soccer Association players
Expatriate soccer players in the United States
Cameroonian expatriate sportspeople in the United States
Cameroonian football managers
Living people
Association football defenders